The Conemaugh Group is a geologic group in West Virginia, Pennsylvania, Ohio, and Maryland. It preserves fossils dating back to the Carboniferous period.

See also

 List of fossiliferous stratigraphic units in West Virginia

References
 

Carboniferous West Virginia
Carboniferous Maryland
Carboniferous geology of Pennsylvania